The 2015 Scottish Women's Premier League Cup was the 14th edition of the SWPL Cup competition, which began in 2002. The competition was to be contested by all 12 teams of the Scottish Women's Premier League (SWPL

First round 
The draw for the first round took place on Saturday, 8 January 2015 at Hampden Park.

Quarter-finals 
The draw for the quarter final took place on Saturday, 4 March 2015 at Hampden Park.

Semi-finals 
The draw for the semi final took place on Saturday, 20 April 2015 at Hampden Park.

Final

External links
at soccerway.com

References

1
Scot
Scottish Women's Premier League seasons